Bogra Airport  is a public use airport  northwest of Bogra, Bangladesh. It is operated by the Bangladesh Air Force. As of July 2015, no scheduled passenger flights serve the airport, but civil air operations are allowed with prior approval.

History
The airport was dedicated on 12 March 2005. According to the Civil Aviation Authority of Bangladesh (CAAB), airlines do not serve Bogra because demand is too low for a route to be commercially viable without smaller aircraft than those the airlines operate. The Independent reported a senior CAAB official as saying, "If the airlines are not interested in using our airports, we can't force them to." The same official said a government subsidy could convince airlines to use Bogra. As it is now, airport staff are paid without having to work.

Bangladesh Air Force currently use this airport for general duty pilot training.

On 22 October 2009, a PT-6 training aircraft of the Bangladesh Air Force experienced engine trouble shortly after takeoff from Bogra. It crash-landed on the runway and flipped over, severely damaging the aircraft and injuring the pilot and co-pilot.

Airlines and destination
Currently there are no scheduled flights operated by any airlines.

See also
 List of airports in Bangladesh

References

External links 
 Airport record for Bogra Airport at Landings.com
 SkyVector aeronautical chart for VGBG

Airports in Bangladesh
Bogura District